Rare Trax is the first compilation album by Swedish extreme metal band Meshuggah. It was released on 21 August 2001 by Nuclear Blast. It compiles the three songs from the band's first 1989 release, Meshuggah, along with other rare songs that the band had recorded but never released.

The CD-ROM also contains the music video for the song "New Millennium Cyanide Christ" from Chaosphere, which features the band on a tour bus, air-playing all the instruments (with Jens Kidman yelling into a pen) and headbanging in unison.

"War" was the first Meshuggah song to feature programmed drums. The remix for the song "Concatenation" is a slower version of the song with a different drum beat. The person on the cover and inlay photographs is tour manager Per Wikström.

Track listing

Personnel

Meshuggah
 Jens Kidman − vocals
 Fredrik Thordendal − lead guitar, bass, rhythm guitar on the 2006 re-release
 Mårten Hagström − rhythm guitar, bass
 Tomas Haake − drums

Additional personnel
 Peter Nordin - bass on "Sovereigns Morbidity", and "Debt of Nature"
 Gustaf Hielm - bass on "Don't Speak"

References

Meshuggah albums
2001 compilation albums